Dimitris Koutsoumpas (born 10 August 1955) is a Greek communist politician and MP who has been the General Secretary of the Communist Party of Greece since 14 April 2013.

Political career 
Dimitris Koutsoumpas was born on 10 August 1955 in Lamia, Greece. His father, Apostolis, was exiled for his political actions. Koutsoumpas studied law at the National and Kapodistrian University of Athens and was a member of the Communist Youth of Greece, participating at the Athens Polytechnic uprising against the Regime of the Colonels in November 1973. In 1987, he was elected for the first time to the Central Committee of the Communist Party of Greece, to which he was reelected in the following years. In 1996, he was elected for the first time to the party's politburo. In the same year, he became the director of Rizospastis, the official newspaper of the Communist Party, in which post he remained for the following decade. During his political career, he was also the head of the International Relations sector of the party. He was a candidate in the parliamentary elections of 2000 and 2007 for the Boeotia prefecture, but was not elected.

At the 19th Party Congress, on 14 April 2013, he was elected as the General Secretary of the party, succeeding Aleka Papariga.

Personal life 
Dimitris Koutsoumpas was born in Lamia on the 10th of August 1955. He is married to Anastasia Koutsoumpa and has a daughter. His family were militants in the EAM national resistance, some of them were executed by the Nazi occupational troops or by the military courts in the period of the civil war, the rest were imprisoned and exiled. His father, Apostolis Koutsoumpas, a member of the KKE, was arrested in 1945 in Larisa, tried, imprisoned and exiled for 8 years. Dimitris Koutsoumpas graduated from high school in June 1973, took the Panhellenic entrance exam and entered the Law Department of the University of Athens.

References

External links
 

1955 births
Living people
National and Kapodistrian University of Athens alumni
General Secretaries of the Communist Party of Greece
Stalinism
Anti-revisionists
People from Lamia (city)
20th-century Greek lawyers
Greek MPs 2015 (February–August)
Greek MPs 2015–2019
Greek MPs 2019–2023